The East End Film Festival was one of the UK's largest film festivals. It ceased all operations on 4 March 2020. The owner, Alison Poltock, explained that "the push to provide a more mainstream commercial offering is not for us."

Founded in 2001, and operating in various venues across East London, the festival focussed on emerging British, Eastern European and Asian talent.

History 
The East End Film Festival started in 2000. Originally set up by the East London borough of Tower Hamlets as a platform to recognise local filmmakers, its initial success led to a partnership in 2003 with neighbouring London Borough of Hackney, London Borough of Newham, the Lee Valley Regional Park Authority, and the Raindance Film Festival which ran Raindance East as part of its official selection. As a result of this partnership, the festival was rebranded as Raindance East from 2003 to 2005, but returned to its original East End Film Festival state in 2006.

In 2006, the East End Film Festival opened with the London premiere of actor Richard E. Grant's directorial debut Wah-Wah.  Grant attended the premiere, acted as the festivals Director In Residence, and took part in a Q&A session introducing a special festival screening of Robert Altman's Nashville. Producer In Residence Stephen Woolley also took part in a Q&A following a screening of his film The Crying Game.

The 2007 festival opened with the world premiere of With Gilbert And George, a portrait of Spitalfields-based contemporary artists Gilbert And George, followed by a Q&A with director Julian Cole. The 2007 programme also included a preview of Joe Strummer: The Future Is Unwritten plus a conversation with the film's director, Julien Temple. Nitin Sawhney, musician and patron of the festival, said: "Having been a patron of the festival for four years, it’s been really rewarding to watch the festival grow, reflecting the creative explosion that’s happening in east London at the moment."

The festival opened in 2008 with the London premiere of an independent British feature The Waiting Room. The film's director Roger Goldby and lead actor Ralf Little attended the opening night premiere. The screening was followed by a party at Beach Blanket Babylon in Shoreditch. The festival also included a programme of films exploring teenage angst (including two earlier films starring Elliot Page), a selection of new British features, films from Eastern Europe, as well as a collection of shorts.

In 2009, the festival focused on films which portray aspects of East End and multicultural London life. The program included City Rats, Elevator, British filmmakers Nicola and Teena Collins' debut film The End, Junior Eurovision Song Contest documentary Sounds Like Teen Spirit, discussion panel The London Perambulator, and Another Dimension And How To Get There. There was also a screening of Not In Our Name at Amnesty International's Human Rights Action Centre. The 2009 East End Film Festival trailer was directed and designed by Lucy Izzard, an animation director and illustrator at Slinky Pictures; it featured a variety of comic characters visiting various festival venues such as RichMix, the Whitechapel Gallery, and the Genesis Cinema. In 2009, the festival incorporated almost 200 screenings and events, and had an attendance of over 30,000.

The 2010 East End Film Festival took place between 22 and 30 April. Actress Jaime Winstone was announced as a new festival patron for 2010. The full programme was announced at an event at The Brickhouse in East London on 23 March 2010 by festival director Alison Poltock. The festival kicked off on 22 April with a preview screening of Barney Platts-Mills' 1969 film Bronco Bullfrog (set in Stratford, East London, and starring local kids) prior to its re-release that summer. Highlights included: Mark Donne's The Rime of the Modern Mariner, narrated by musician Carl Barat; SUS, based on the 1979 play about Margaret Thatcher's "stop and search" laws by Barrie Keeffe; and a series of events commemorating Rock Against Racism, the grassroots movement against the National Front in the late 1970s. There was also a free screening of Alfred Hitchcock's classic silent film The Lodger in Spitalfields Market, accompanied by an improvised soundtrack performed live by Minima

For the festival's 10th anniversary in 2011, it looked back on the story of east London with a programme of screenings and events featuring more than sixty feature films and hundreds of shorts, alongside a broad range of live, site-specific events and master classes. The festival opened on 27 April with the World Premiere gala screening of Roger Sargent's The Libertines: There Are No Innocent Bystanders Frequently described as the UK's most important music photographer, Roger Sargent's debut feature is an all-access documentary that followed Carl Barat, Pete Doherty, John Hassall and Gary Powell for The Libertines' reunion in 2010. The East End Film Festival also offered the UK's second-ever screening of Ken Russell’s highly controversial 1971 film The Devils (film). EEFF 2011 saw the launch of Movie May Day, a May Bank Holiday weekend cornucopia of film and culture with hundreds of free screenings, projections, live music, quizzes, filmmaking competitions, and site-specific installations across the East End

The 11th East End Film Festival opened on 3 July 2012 with the UK Premiere of a documentary about Amy Winehouse. The festival foreshadowed the 2012 Summer Olympics’ heart-lifting, international coming together by leading with six days rich in cinema from all over the globe. The festival closed on 8 July with the UK Premiere of Armando Bo's El último Elvis, an acclaimed feature from Argentina about a delusional Elvis impersonator. Armando Bo returned to the festival again in 2013 as a member of the panel judging the best feature films of the festival that year. The festival's fringe event, CineEast, took place on Sunday 1 July with a day of free events featuring short and feature film screenings, live music, talks, workshops, film trails and competitions, incorporating over 1000 films and site-specific events in over 100 different venues, including cinemas, cultural spaces, shops, restaurants and art galleries.

The 12th East End Film Festival ran from 25 June until 10 July, opening with the world premiere of Mark Donne's documentary The UK Gold. The film was screened at the Troxy. The EEFF closed with Rob Epstein and Jeffery Friedman's Lovelace, a biopic retro period drama following the story of Linda Lovelace, a woman who is ‘used and abused by the porn industry at the behest of her coercive husband, before taking control of her life.’ 2013's Best Film Award went to Halley, which follows the story of a security guard at a Mexico City gym whose health drastically begins to deteriorate. Sebastian Hofmann's award means he will return to the festival in 2014 as the EEFF's Director-in-Residence, and co-curator for the festival's Mexican focus in 2014.

The 13th East End Film Festival opened on 13 June 2014 with the world premiere of Dermaphoria, East End filmmaker Ross Clarke feature debut. The film features a strong cast led by Joseph Morgan, Ron Perlman and Kate Walsh, following the story of 'an inspired experimental chemist, wakes up in a New Orleans jail, accused of arson that's linked to an illegal drug-manufacturing ring. Suffering from amnesia, he's unexpectedly released on bail, determined to find his missing girlfriend.' Genesis Cinema, the festival's original birthplace, was the host venue for the opening night. The festival closed on 25 June, with Jack Bond's The Blue Black Hussar, a documentary that explores the life of one of London's finest, Adam Ant. Bond captures throughout the film a spirit of defiance and the artistic endeavour of a man 'has lost the warpaint but this intriguing documentary finds his dandyish, swashbuckling nature intact.'

The 14th East End Film Festival ran from 1 July until 12 July 2015, opening with the international premiere of Amit Gupta's third feature One Crazy Thing. Starring and produced by EEFF alumnus Ray Panthaki (Life Sentence, EEFF 2013), the film follows the premise on how a chance encounter in the city can reinvigorate you, as it deals with the possibilities of life in London. The festival closed with a documentary by Marc Silver, another EEFF alumnus. The British documentary maker once again travelled to the United States in his follow-up to Who is Dayani Cristal?, providing a ruthless dissection of the aftermath of a tragic incident at a Jacksonville, Florida gas station, which resulted in the death of 17-year-old Jordan Davis.

The 15th edition of the East End Film Festival was opened on 23 June 2016 with the world premiere of London-based Ian Bonhôte's feature debut Alleycats, featuring a fantastic turn by John Hannah (Four Weddings & A Funeral, Sliding Doors, The Mummy) as a shady MP, the film is a riotously entertaining, tense gauntlet ride through the streets of London (and East London), featuring a flock of rising British talent, all of them on wheels. The festival was also host of the UK Premiere of Daniel Florencio's feature debut, Chasing Robert Barker. The film, inspired by Florêncio's short documentary Tracking William: A Night with a Paparazzo, produced for Current TV, portrays a photographer turned paparazzi caught in the downward spiral of a fabricated tabloid story. It was nominated for the Accession Award for Best Screenwriting that same year. The EEFF closed with Steve Read, Rob Alexander's London premiere of Gary Numan: Android in La La Land, a documentary that follows the artist behind bonafide smash hits Cars and Are ‘Friends’ Electric? as he returns to the world stage, and moves to California.

Awards 
Each year, the festival handed out awards on the festival's closing night. These included:
Best UK Short Film
Best UK First Feature
Best International First Feature
Best Documentary Feature
Short Film Audience Award

Patrons 
Patrons included Danny Boyle, Steven Berkoff, Tony Grisoni, Asif Kapadia, Michael Nyman, Paweł Pawlikowski, Nitin Sawhney, Jason Solomons, Parminder Vir, Jaime Winstone, Jeremy Wooding, Stephen Woolley, and Joe Wright.

References

External links 

Film festivals in London